Kristiyan Kochilov (Bulgarian: Кристиян Кочилов; born 3 April 1990) is a Bulgarian professional footballer who plays as a midfielder for Bulgarian Third League club Vitosha Bistritsa.

Career

Vitosha Bistritsa
Kochilov joined Vitosha Bistritsa in 2015 from Slivnishki Geroy. He completed his fully professional debut for the team on 22 July 2017 in a first division match against Cherno More Varna.

References

External links
 

1990 births
Living people
Bulgarian footballers
Association football midfielders
FC Vitosha Bistritsa players
FC Sportist Svoge players
First Professional Football League (Bulgaria) players
People from Vratsa